Hans Christian Bernat (born 13 November 2000) is a Danish professional footballer who plays as a goalkeeper for OB in the Danish Superliga.

Early life 
Bernat was born in Morud, a town on the island of Funen. His father, Robert Bernat, is a former goalkeeper who played for B 1909, Næsby Boldklub and Vejle Boldklub. He is of Polish descent through his father, whose parents fled to Denmark from Poland after World War II.

Club career

OB

Early career
Bernat started his career for local clubs on Funen, Morud IF and Næsby Boldklub, before moving to the biggest club on the island, OB. He moved to the FC Nordsjælland academy in January 2016, but returned to OB after six months, where he signed a three-year youth contract. Bernat progressed through the youth system and went on a trials with two Premier League clubs; Brighton & Hove Albion in 2017 and Manchester United in August 2018. He eventually continued playing for OB, signing his first professional contract – a two-year deal – with the club on 16 March 2019, as he was also promoted to the first-team squad. Bernat signed another contract extension on 29 December 2019, keeping him part of the club until 2024.

First team
Bernat made his professional debut on 8 July 2020, starting the game against Silkeborg IF.

International career
Bernat has represented Denmark at youth international levels from under-16 to under-19.

Career statistics

References

2000 births
Living people
Danish people of Polish descent
Danish men's footballers
Denmark youth international footballers
Næsby Boldklub players
FC Nordsjælland players
Odense Boldklub players
Danish Superliga players
Association football goalkeepers